A total solar eclipse occurred at the Moon's ascending node of the orbit on July 31, 1981. A solar eclipse occurs when the Moon passes between Earth and the Sun, thereby totally or partly obscuring the image of the Sun for a viewer on Earth. A total solar eclipse occurs when the Moon's apparent diameter is larger than the Sun's, blocking all direct sunlight, turning day into darkness. Totality occurs in a narrow path across Earth's surface, with the partial solar eclipse visible over a surrounding region thousands of kilometres wide. The continental path of totality fell entirely within the Soviet Union, belonging to Georgia, Kazakhstan and Russia today. The southern part of Mount Elbrus, the highest mountain in Europe, also lies in the path of totality. Occurring only 3.8 days after perigee (Perigee on July 27, 1981), the Moon's apparent diameter was larger. With a path width of 107.8 km (66.984 mi, or 353,674.541 feet), this total solar eclipse had an average path.

It was the 20th eclipse of the 145th Saros cycle, which began with a partial eclipse on January 4, 1639 and will conclude with a partial eclipse on April 17, 3009.

The moon's apparent diameter was 7 arcseconds larger than the February 4, 1981 annular solar eclipse.

Related eclipses

Eclipses in 1981 
 A penumbral lunar eclipse on Tuesday, 20 January 1981.
 An annular solar eclipse on Wednesday, 4 February 1981.
 A partial lunar eclipse on Friday, 17 July 1981.
 A total solar eclipse on Friday, 31 July 1981.

Solar eclipses of 1979–1982

Saros 145

Tritos series

Metonic series

References

External links

 Solar Corona Shape

Photos:
 Prof. Druckmüller's eclipse photography site: Solar eclipse of July 31, 1981
 Prof. Druckmüller's eclipse photography site: Solar eclipse of July 31, 1981 (Fe XIV and Fe X images)

1981 07 31
1981 in science
1981 07 31
July 1981 events
1981 in the Soviet Union